The first government of Giorgi Kvirikashvili was the government (cabinet) of Georgia, with Giorgi Kvirikashvili as its head as the country's Prime Minister. It was nominated by the ruling Georgian Dream coalition after the preceding Garibashvili government was dissolved following Garibashvili's resignation and won the confidence vote in the Parliament of Georgia overnight from December 29 to December 30, 2015. On 26 November 2016, after the October 2016 parliamentary election, the second Kvirikashvili government was approved by the Parliament.

List of ministers and portfolios

References

Government of Georgia (country)
2015 establishments in Georgia (country)
Cabinets established in 2015
2016 disestablishments in Georgia (country)
Cabinets disestablished in 2016